The Red Sulphur Springs Hotel was a spring resort in Red Sulphur Springs, West Virginia. It held a social event every evening. When residents died there, to avoid compromising its reputation, bodies were secretly taken to a cemetery about two miles away, where many of the grave markers have no name. The hotel opened in 1832 and closed in 1917; the last event held there was a dance. At one time Martin Van Buren, the president of the United States, visited the hotel, which was once owned by Levi Morton, Vice President under Benjamin Harrison. After its closure in 1917, the hotel was dismantled and only a small, concrete base remains where the pavilion once stood.

Sources
 Red Sulphur Springs, Monroe County, Virginia By William Burke
 The Red Sulphur Springs; Minister Morton's Hotel in the Happy Valley
Around the Red Sulphur; The Virginia Mountains and Their People.
Summer Letters.; Letter-Links between New-York and Virginia.
Summer Letters.; Letter-Links between New-York and Virginia.

External links

Buildings and structures in Monroe County, West Virginia
Defunct resorts
Destination spas
Hotel buildings completed in 1832
Hotels disestablished in 1917
Hotels established in 1832
Hotels in West Virginia
Resorts in West Virginia
Historic American Buildings Survey in West Virginia
Defunct hotels in West Virginia